Sanell Aggenbach (born 1975) is a South African artist living and working in Woodstock, Cape Town. Using painting, printmaking, and sculpture, her work addresses the relationship between history and private narratives, with a sense of ambiguity. Her work also explores the processes of nostalgia and historical myth-making, often incorporating the playful, disarming, and absurd to draw the viewer into discussions of darker subjects.  She has a unique style of combining traditional painting techniques with sculptural elements, as well as typically feminine crafts such as sewing and tapestry.

Career
Aggenbach graduated from the University of Stellenbosch in 1997 with a bachelor's degree in Fine Arts. Although now a full-time artist, Aggenbach was a lecturer from June 2000– March 2004 at the Cape College in Graphic Processes, Two-Dimensional Design and Drawing. Her work is represented in the Spier Collection, Anglo Gold South Africa, Sasol Art Museum, the Sasol Collection, and the Hollard Collection.

Solo exhibitions
2013: 'Familia Obscura', Brundyn +, Cape Town
2011: 'Some Dance to Remember Some Dance to Forget', Blank Projects, Cape Town
2009: 'Graceland', Gallery AOP, Johannesburg
2008: ' Sub Rosa', João Ferreira Gallery, Cape Town
2007: 'Perfectly Still', Absa Gallery, Johannesburg
2006: 'Blues and Greys', Art on Paper Gallery, Johannesburg
2005: 'Fool's Gold', Bell-Roberts Contemporary, Cape Town 
2005: 'Hoogwater/High Tide', KKNK, Oudtshoorn
2003: 'Blank', AVA Gallery, Cape Town 
2001: 'From a Netherworld', Bell-Roberts Gallery, Cape Town 
2000: 'Northern Ladies', Art Konsult, New Delhi, India
1998: 'An Imitator', AVA Metropolitan Gallery, Cape Town

Group exhibitions
2011: 'Alptraum', Deutscher Kuenstlerbund, Berlin, Germany
2010: 'Twenty', contemporary public sculpture, Nirox, Johannesburg
2008: 'Print '08: Myth, Memory and Archive', Bell-Roberts Gallery, Cape Town
2007: 'Arcadia', AVA Gallery, Cape Town
2007: 'Turbulence', Hangar-7, Salzburg, Austria
2007: Spier Contemporary, Stellenbosch
2006: '20 Artists 06'. Contemporary printing, Bell-Roberts Gallery, Cape Town
2005: 'Sweet Nothings', new photographic work, Bell-Roberts Gallery, Cape Town
2004: '40 Years', University of Stellenbosch, Sasol Art Museum
2004: '2nd Spier Outdoor Sculpture Biennial', Stellenbosch
2003: 'Picnic', Bell-Roberts Gallery, Cape Town
2003: Brett Kebble Art Awards
2003: 'ABSA L'Atelier', Johannesburg 
2003: 'YDESIRE', Castle of Good Hope, Cape Town
2002: 'Autogeographie', Millennium Gallery, Johannesburg
2002: 'Spier Outdoor Sculpture Biennial', Jan Marais Nature Reserve, Stellenbosch
2001: 'Micro/Macro', South African Printmakers at the Xchanges Gallery, Victoria, British Columbia (Canada)
2001: 'ABSA L'Atelier', Johannesburg.
2001: 'Aarsel/ Waver', KKNK, Oudshoorn

Notable works

Some Dance To Remember Some Dance To Forget
A 2011 series of monotype prints that pay tribute to iconic images and albums from rock music history. Through these prints, Aggenbach offers a critique of African er identity, focusing on the generation inspired by the post-punk musicians.

Graceland
A 2009 exhibition at Gallery AOP inspired by a trip to Elvis's home in Memphis, Tennessee, exploring what it means to be Afrikaans.

Sub Rosa
A 2008 body of work referencing tampered photographic film, which blurs the distinction between the imagined accuracy of photography and the inaccurate or misleading nature of painting.

References

External links
Bell-Roberts
Warren Editions

South African artists
Stellenbosch University alumni
1975 births
Living people